The Cleveland Elementary School shooting was a school shooting that took place on January 29, 1979, at Grover Cleveland Elementary School in San Diego, California, United States. The principal and a custodian were killed; eight children and police officer Robert Robb were injured. A 16-year-old girl, Brenda Spencer,  who lived in a house across the street from the school, was convicted of the shootings. Charged as an adult, she pleaded guilty to two counts of murder and assault with a deadly weapon, and was sentenced to life in prison with a chance of parole after 25 years.

A reporter reached Spencer by phone while she was still in the house after the shooting, and asked her why she committed the crime. She reportedly answered: "I don't like Mondays. This livens up the day", which inspired Bob Geldof and Johnnie Fingers to write the Boomtown Rats song "I Don't Like Mondays".

Perpetrator 

Brenda Ann Spencer (born April 3, 1962) is an incarcerated American murderer who in 1979 committed a school shooting at the Grover Cleveland Elementary School in the San Diego Unified School District in the San Carlos neighborhood of San Diego, California. At the time, she lived in a house across the street from the school. Aged 16 at the time of the shooting, she was 5'2" (157 cm) and had bright red hair. After her parents separated, she allegedly lived in poverty with her father, Wallace Spencer. Both father and daughter slept on a single mattress on the living room floor in a house strewn with empty bottles from alcoholic drinks. 

Acquaintances said Spencer expressed hostility toward policemen, had spoken about shooting one, and had talked of doing something big to get on television. Although Spencer showed exceptional ability as a photographer, winning first prize in a Humane Society competition, she was generally uninterested in school. She attended Patrick Henry High School, where one teacher recalled frequently inquiring if she was awake in class. Later, during tests while she was in custody, it was discovered Spencer had an injury to the temporal lobe of her brain. It was attributed to an accident on her bicycle.

In early 1978, staff at a facility for problem students, into which Spencer had been referred for truancy, informed her parents that she was suicidal. That summer, Spencer, who was known to hunt birds in the neighborhood, was arrested for shooting out the windows of Grover Cleveland Elementary with a BB gun and for burglary.

In December, a psychiatric evaluation arranged by her probation officer recommended that Spencer be admitted to a mental hospital for depression, but her father refused to give permission. For Christmas 1978, he gave her a Ruger 10/22 semi-automatic .22 caliber rifle with a telescopic sight and 500 rounds of ammunition. Spencer later said, "I asked for a radio and got a rifle." Asked why he had done that, she answered, "He bought the rifle so I would kill myself."

Shooting 
On the morning of Monday, January 29, 1979, Spencer began shooting from her house at children waiting for 53-year-old Principal Burton Wragg to open the gates to Grover Cleveland Elementary. She injured eight children; she began with nine-year-old Cam Miller, since he was wearing Spencer's favorite color blue. Spencer shot and killed Wragg as he and teacher Daryl Barnes tried to help children. She also killed 56-year-old custodian Mike Suchar as he tried to pull a student to safety. A 28-year-old police officer, Robert Robb, had responded to a call for assistance during the incident, where he was wounded in the neck as he arrived.

Further casualties were avoided only because the police obstructed her line of fire by moving a garbage truck in front of the school entrance.

After firing thirty-six times, Spencer barricaded herself inside her home for several hours. While there, she spoke by telephone to a reporter from The San Diego Union-Tribune, who had been randomly calling telephone numbers in the neighborhood. Spencer told the reporter she had shot at the schoolchildren and adults because, "I don't like Mondays. This livens up the day." She also told police negotiators the children and adults whom she had shot were easy targets and that she was going to "come out shooting". Spencer has been repeatedly reminded of these statements at parole hearings. Ultimately, she surrendered and left the house, reportedly after being promised a Burger King meal by negotiators. Police officers found beer and whiskey bottles cluttered around the house but said Spencer did not appear to be intoxicated when arrested. Crime-scene photos contradict these accounts.

Imprisonment 
Spencer was charged as an adult and pleaded guilty to two counts of murder and assault with a deadly weapon. On April 4, 1980, a day after her 18th birthday, she was sentenced to 25 years to life. In prison, Spencer was diagnosed with epilepsy and received medication to treat epilepsy and depression. While at the California Institution for Women in Chino, she worked repairing electronic equipment.

Under the terms of her sentencing, Spencer became eligible for hearings to consider her suitability for parole in 1993. As of 2022, Spencer has been unsuccessful at six parole board hearings.

At her first hearing, in 1993, Spencer said she had hoped police would shoot her, and that she had been a user of alcohol and drugs at the time of the crime, although the results of drug tests done when she was taken into custody were negative. In her 2001 hearing, Spencer claimed that her father had been subjecting her to beatings and sexual abuse, but he said the allegations were not true. The parole board chairman said that as she had not previously told anyone about the allegations, he doubted whether they were true. In 2005, a San Diego deputy district attorney cited an incident of self-harm from four years earlier when Spencer's girlfriend was released from jail, as showing that Spencer was psychotic and unfit to be released. Early reports indicated that Spencer had scratched the words "courage" and "pride" into her own skin; Spencer corrected this during her parole hearing as reading "unforgiven" and "alone".

In 2009, the board again refused her application for parole, and ruled it would be ten years before she would be considered again. In August 2022, Spencer and the Board of Parole Hearings agreed that she was not suitable for parole and that she would not be eligible for another hearing for another three years as a result of this parole suitability denial. She remains imprisoned at the California Institution for Women in Chino. Her next opportunity for a parole hearing will be in 2025.

Aftermath 
A plaque and flagpole were erected at Cleveland Elementary in memory of the shooting victims. The school was closed in 1983, along with a dozen other schools around the city, due to declining enrollment. In the ensuing decades, it was leased to several charter and private schools. From 2005 to 2017, it housed the Magnolia Science Academy, a public charter middle school serving students in grades 6–8. In 2018, the school was demolished to construct a housing development, and the plaque was relocated to the former school's southern edge, at the corner of Lake Atlin Avenue and Lake Angela Drive.

On January 17, 1989, almost ten years after the events at San Diego's Grover Cleveland Elementary, there was another shooting at a school coincidentally named Grover Cleveland Elementary, this one in Stockton, California. Five students were killed and thirty were injured. Christy Buell, a survivor of the 1979 shooting, said that she was "shocked, saddened, horrified" by the headlines concerning the 1989 shooting.

Media

Song 
Bob Geldof, then the lead singer of the Boomtown Rats, read about the incident when a news story about it came off the telex at WRAS-FM, the campus radio station at Georgia State University in Atlanta. He was particularly struck by Spencer's claim that she did it because she did not like Mondays, and began writing a song about it, called "I Don't Like Mondays". It was released in July 1979 and was number one for four weeks in the United Kingdom, and was the band's biggest hit in their native Ireland. Although it did not make the Top 40 in the U.S., it still received extensive radio airplay (outside of the San Diego area) despite the Spencer family's efforts to prevent it. Geldof has later mentioned that, "[Spencer] wrote to me saying 'she was glad she'd done it because I'd made her famous,' which is not a good thing to live with." Spencer disputes ever contacting Geldof.

Films and television 
The 1982 Japanese–American documentary film The Killing of America depicts the incident. The 2006 British documentary I Don't Like Mondays also revisits the case.

The Lifetime Movies series Killer Kids released an episode "Deadly Compulsion" depicting Spencer's crimes which first aired date in September 3, 2014.

The Investigation Discovery network portrayed Spencer's crimes in one of the three cases presented in the premiere episode of season 2 on the crime documentary series Deadly Women, titled "Thrill Killers", first air date: October 9, 2008.

See also
 List of homicides in California

References

Further reading 
 
 

Parole Hearing transcripts:
 

Videos:
 Archived at Ghostarchive and the Wayback Machine: 
 Archived at Ghostarchive and the Wayback Machine: 
 Archived at Ghostarchive and the Wayback Machine: 
 Archived at Ghostarchive and the Wayback Machine: 
 Archived at Ghostarchive and the Wayback Machine:

External links 

 San Diego Police Museum - Brenda-Spencer
 School Shooters.info - Brenda Spencer
 Murder Historian - I Don't Like Mondays Blog

1979 in California
1979 mass shootings in the United States
1979 murders in the United States
1970s crimes in California
Deaths by firearm in California
Attacks on buildings and structures in the United States
Elementary school killings in the United States
Elementary school shootings in the United States
1970s in San Diego
January 1979 crimes
Mass shootings in California
Mass shootings in the United States
Murder committed by minors
Murder in California
School killings in the United States
School shootings in California
January 1979 events in the United States